Metrophanes II (? – 1 August 1443) served as Bishop of Cyzicus in Asia Minor when he was called to join the delegation of bishops attending the Council of Florence. He was appointed by the Emperor John VIII in May 1440 as successor to Patriarch Joseph II of Constantinople following the death of the latter in Florence. The Emperor was eager to secure help from Pope Eugene IV to deal with Turkish aggression, so he forced the patriarch and all other bishops to submit to papal authority. Only one bishop did not submit: Markos Eugenikos, Metropolitan of Ephesus, and without his signature the document of Union between East-West fell inactive. For his submission to the Union, he was nicknamed Mitrofonos (Mother-Killer). Metrophanes consecrated several unionist bishops and repeatedly pressed the Emperor John VIII to support the union openly. John finally agreed to summon a local council of bishops, but Metrophanes died before the council could meet.

Metrophanes died in Constantinople on August 1, 1443.

Bibliography

 Louis Bréhier, Life and Death of Byzantium, republication Abin Michel, Paris, 1969.
 Ivan Djuric, Twilight of Byzantium, Maisonneuve & Larose, Paris, 1996.
 Venantius Grumel, Treaty of Byzantine Studies, vol. I: The Chronology, Presses Universitaires de France, Paris, 1958.
 Donald MacGillivray Nicol, The last centuries of Byzantium, 1261-1453, Texto reissue Les Belles Lettres, 2005.
 Nicolas Viton de Saint-Allais, The art of verifying dates, Volume I, Paris, 1818, p. 493.
Joseph Gill, The Council of Florence Cambridge, Cambridge University Press, 1959. 

Year of birth missing
1443 deaths
15th-century patriarchs of Constantinople
Converts to Eastern Catholicism from Eastern Orthodoxy
Former Greek Orthodox Christians
Greek Eastern Catholics
Bishops of Cyzicus